Passalus punctatostriatus is a beetle of the family Passalidae. Mating takes place within galleries of the rotten wood the species lives in.

References 

Passalidae